Lāna‘i City is a census-designated place (CDP) on the island of Lāna‘i, in Maui County, Hawai‘i, United States. The population was 3,332 at the 2020 census. Lāna‘i City is the island's commercial center.  Many of the island's restaurants and shops are in the town square that surrounds Dole Park, and the only hospital on the island, Lāna‘i Community Hospital, is located near the park.

Lāna‘i City is served by Lāna‘i Airport (LNY).

Geography and climate

Lāna‘i City experiences a tropical savanna climate (Köppen classification As) with a mostly dry summer season. The average temperature in January is almost cool enough to qualify this climate as a warm-winter form of a Mediterranean climate (Köppen climate classification Csa).

History
Dole owned the entire island for a time, and in the 1920s built Lāna‘i City to house and serve the community of workers. It was the first model city in Hawai‘i. In 1923 several stores, a bank, a hospital, a theater, a church and business headquarters were built around an open park space. In 1930 model homes for couples featuring two bedrooms, a large living room, a kitchen, with running water, electricity and spacious yards were erected. The single men's houses had three furnished rooms and also running water and electricity.

In 2009, the corporation Castle & Cooke, which had been spun off from the Dole Food Company, announced its intent to demolish much of what remained of the historic district, including homes, a laundromat, and a jailhouse—all dating back to the 1920s—in order to build new commercial structures. The development would have included a supermarket described by the National Trust for Historic Preservation as "oversized" and "out-of-scale". The intact plantation town is something not found on any of the other Hawaiian Islands.

However, in June 2012, Castle & Cooke sold its island possessions (totaling 98% of the island) to billionaire Larry Ellison for $300 million.

Demographics

As of the census of 2000, there were 3,164 people, 1,148 households, and 796 families residing in the CDP. The racial makeup of the CDP was 13.24% White, 0.13% African American, 0.38% Native American, 58.09% Asian, 7.02% Pacific Islander, 0.32% from other races, and 20.83% from two or more races. Hispanic or Latino of any race were 7.74% of the population.

There were 1,148 households, out of which 34.9% had children under the age of 18 living with them, 53.7% were married couples living together, 9.9% had a female householder with no husband present, and 30.6% were non-families. 25.7% of all households were made up of individuals, and 8.8% had someone living alone who was 65 years of age or older.  The average household size was 2.75 and the average family size was 3.33.

In the CDP the population was spread out, with 28.0% under the age of 18, 7.9% from 18 to 24, 28.3% from 25 to 44, 21.4% from 45 to 64, and 14.4% who were 65 years of age or older. The median age was 35 years. For every 100 females, there were 101.4 males. For every 100 females age 18 and over, there were 100.6 males.

The median income for a household in the CDP was $43,271, and the median income for a family was $49,209. Males had a median income of $29,800 versus $27,065 for females. The per capita income for the CDP was $18,668. About 8.5% of families and 9.5% of the population were below the poverty line, including 7.2% of those under age 18 and 11.9% of those age 65 or over.

Urban infrastructure 
Lanai City hosts a community hospital, a community health center, an Olympic-size public pool, a state-of-the art movie theater, a supermarket and a public library.

See also
 Lanai High and Elementary School

References

Census-designated places in Maui County, Hawaii
Populated places on Lanai